Samuel Burr Sherwood (November 26, 1767 – April 27, 1833) was a U.S. Representative from Connecticut.

He was born in Northfield Society (later Weston), Connecticut. Sherwood graduated from Yale College in 1786. He studied law, was admitted to the bar, and began practice in that part of Fairfield which is now Westport, Connecticut.

He served as member of the state House of Representatives from 1809 until 1815 and in the state Senate in 1816.

Sherwood was elected as a Federalist to the Fifteenth Congress (March 4, 1817 – March 3, 1819).

He resumed the practice of his profession until 1831, when he retired from professional life.
He died in Westport on April 27, 1833, and was interred in Evergreen Cemetery.

References

1767 births
1833 deaths
Yale College alumni
Members of the Connecticut House of Representatives
People from Weston, Connecticut
Connecticut lawyers
Members of the Connecticut General Assembly Council of Assistants (1662–1818)
Federalist Party members of the United States House of Representatives from Connecticut
19th-century American lawyers